In baseball, a run batted in (RBI) is awarded to a batter for each runner who scores as a result of the batter's action, including a hit, fielder's choice, sacrifice fly, sacrifice bunt, catcher's interference, or a walk or hit by pitch with the bases loaded.  A batter is also awarded an RBI for scoring himself upon hitting a home run.  Sixteen players have batted in at least 10 runs in a single Major League Baseball (MLB) game to date, the most recent being Mark Reynolds of the Washington Nationals on July 6, 2018.  No player has accomplished the feat more than once in his career and no player has ever recorded more than 12 RBIs in a game. Wilbert Robinson was the first player to record at least 10 RBIs in a single game, driving in 11 runs for the Baltimore Orioles against the St. Louis Browns on June 10, 1892.

, every team that has had a player achieve the milestone has won the game in which it occurred. These games have resulted in other single-game MLB records being set due to the prodigious offensive performance. Robinson, for example, also amassed seven hits in that same game, setting a new major league record that has since been tied by only one other player.  Mark Whiten hit four home runs to complement his 12 RBIs for the St. Louis Cardinals on September 7, 1993, tying the single-game records in both categories.  By attaining both milestones, he became one of only two players to hit four home runs and drive in 10 or more runs in the same game, with Scooter Gennett being the other.  Tony Lazzeri, Rudy York, and Nomar Garciaparra hit two grand slams during their 10 RBI game, equaling the record for most grand slams in one game.  Norm Zauchin has the fewest career RBIs among players who have 10 RBIs in one game with 159, while Alex Rodriguez, with 2,086, drove in more runs than any other player in this group and hit the third most in major league history.

Of the eight players eligible for the Baseball Hall of Fame who have batted in 10 runs in a game, four have been elected and one was elected on the first ballot. Players are eligible for the Hall of Fame if they have played in at least 10 MLB seasons, and have either been retired for five seasons or deceased for at least six months. These requirements leave three players ineligible who are living and have played in the past five seasons and two—Phil Weintraub and Zauchin—who did not play in 10 seasons.

Players

References
General

Specific

Runs batted in, single game